Noumahla Masjid (Urdu: نو محلہ مسجد)  is one of the historical mosques built in Bareilly district of Uttar Pradesh. This mosque was established in 1749 by Syed Shaji Baba and its concrete construction was completed in 1906.

History 
When the flames of the first revolution flared up in 1857, the brave sons of Rohilkhand also jumped into the freedom struggle.  At that time the revolutionaries were led by Nawab Khan Bahadur Khan. He made Naumhala Mosque as his headquarters. Revolutionaries used to meet here.  Here the strategy of Jung-e-Azadi was used against the British rule.

Islamic Research Center report says the caretakers of the mosque tell that the Noumahla Masjid was the main stronghold of the revolutionaries and here a strategy was made against the British, when the British came to know about it, they attacked the mosque and here Ismail Shah was martyred while giving azaan. Along with this, to save their pride from the British, all the women jumped into the well and gave their lives.  He told that it is here that all the revolutionaries are buried here.

References 

Mosques
Islamic holy places
Building types
Islamic architecture
Mosque architecture
Bareilly